The National Guitar Museum (NGM) is a museum dedicated to the guitar's history, evolution, and cultural impact; and to promoting and preserving the guitar's legacy. The NGM addresses the history of the guitar as it has evolved from ancient stringed instruments to the wide variety of instruments created over the past 200 years. It focuses on the guitar's inventors, innovators, and influential players, along with the science and technology behind the guitar's construction, shape, and sound.

The NGM does not have a permanent location, but rather exhibits its collection in a touring format.

Overview
The museum was founded by author and former Guitar magazine editor-in-chief HP Newquist, who serves as its executive director. It is the first museum to focus solely on all aspects of the guitar and to include instruments from most of the world's stringed instrument manufacturers. The NGM's collection focuses on representative instruments from a vast array of historical makers and modern luthiers.

The NGM's board of advisors includes guitarists Tony Iommi, Steve Howe, Steve Vai, Ritchie Blackmore, Liona Boyd, Al Di Meola, and Joe Bonamassa. Johnny Winter served on the board prior to his death. Curators include guitar industry veterans Rich Maloof and Pete Prown.

History 
In 2011, the NGM collection began touring the United States in a variety of exhibitions. 

In 2012, it was announced that at the completion of its exhibition tours, one U.S. city was expected to be chosen as the permanent home of the National Guitar Museum. As of 2023, a permanent home for the NGM has still not been chosen.

Touring exhibitions

"GUITAR: The Instrument That Rocked The World" 

In February 2011, the NGM launched its first touring exhibit, entitled "GUITAR: The Instrument That Rocked The World," which began with previews outside New York City. The national rollout was in Orlando, Florida, on June 11, 2011. The exhibit traveled to sites across the United States from 2011 to 2022. 

The hosts for the GUITAR Exhibit:
 Discovery Museum and Planetarium (Bridgeport, CT): February 15 – May 15, 2011 (Previews)
 Orlando Science Center (Orlando, FL): June 11, 2011 – January 4, 2012 (National Launch)
 Louisville Science Center (Louisville, KY): January 21 – April 22, 2012
 Carnegie Science Center (Pittsburgh, PA): June 16 – September 30, 2012
 Science Museum of Virginia (Richmond, VA): October 13 – January 6, 2013
 The Springfield Science Museum (Springfield, MA): January 18 – April 21, 2013
 The Museum of Idaho (Idaho Falls, ID): June 10 – November 30, 2013
 The Reuben H. Fleet Science Center (San Diego, CA): December 20, 2013 – April 6, 2014
 The Bishop Museum (Honolulu, Hawai’i): May 2014 – September 1, 2014
 Liberty Science Center (Liberty State Park, Jersey City, NJ): October 2014 – January 2015
 Imagination Station (Toledo, OH): February 2015 – May 2015
 Discovery Place (Charlotte, NC): May 31, 2015 – September 2015
 Oregon Museum of Science and Industry (Portland, OR): October 2015 – January 2016
 Exploration Place (Wichita, KS): January 2016 – April 2016
 Whitaker Center (Harrisburg, CA): May 2016 – September 2016
 Gulf Coast Exploreum (Mobile, AL): September 2016 – January 2017
 Buffalo Museum of Science (Buffalo, NY): January 2017 – May 2017
 The Berkshire Museum (Pittsfield, MA): May 2017 – September 2017
 Kalamazoo Valley Museum (Kalamazoo, MI): September 2017 – January 2018
 Fort Worth Museum of Science and History (Fort Worth, TX): January 2018 – May 2018
 Museum of the Rockies (Bozeman, MT): May 2018 – September 2018
 Cincinnati Museum Center (Cincinnati, OH): September 2018 – January 2019
 St. Louis Science Center (St. Louis, MO): January 19 – April 14, 2019
 The History Museum at the Castle (Appleton, WI): May 2019 – January 2020
 McWane Science Center (Birmingham, AL): January 2020 – September 2020
 Peoria Riverfront Museum (Peoria, IL): October 2020 - January 2021
 Durham Museum (Omaha, NE): February 2021 - April 2021
 The Bullock Texas State History Museum (Austin, TX): May 2021 - July 2021
 Denver Museum of Nature and Science (Denver, CO): October 2021 – April 2022
 Carnegie Science Center (Pittsburgh, PA): May 2022 – October 2022

"Medieval To Metal: The Art & Evolution Of The GUITAR" 
The NGM curates a touring art exhibition, "Medieval To Metal: The Art & Evolution Of The GUITAR." It debuted at the Leigh Yawkey Woodson Art Museum in Wisconsin in February 2015. It has since been presented at more than a dozen art museums in the United States, including:
 Leigh Yawkey Woodson Art Museum: February 28, 2015 - May 31, 2016
 New Mexico Museum of Art: February 6, 2016 - May 1, 2016
 Sonoma County Museum: May 27, 2016 – September 5, 2016
 The Haggin Museum: October 6, 2016 – January 8, 2017
 Butler Institute of American Art: January 20, 2017 – April 30, 2017
 Saginaw Art Museum: September 29 – January 6, 2017
 Vero Beach Museum of Art: January 27 – May 6, 2018
 The Appleton Museum of Art: May 14 – September 3, 2018
 Fort Wayne Museum of Art: September 29, 2018 – January 6, 2019
 Stamford Museum: February 22 – May 26, 2019
 Currier Museum of Art: June 29 – September 22, 2019
 National Czech & Slovak Museum & Library: October 5, 2019 – January 26, 2020
 The Museum of Texas Tech University: February 9 – May 9, 2020
 Carlsbad Museum: June 22 – September 4, 2020
 Museum of Arts and Sciences (Daytona Beach, FL): September 19 – January 10, 2021
 Buffalo Museum of Science: February 13, 2021 – September 6, 2021
 Reading Public Museum: October 2021 – January 2022
 Lauren Rogers Museum of Art: January 2022 – April 2022
 The Powerhouse Museum: April 2022 – September 2022

"America At The Crossroads: The GUITAR And A Changing Nation" 
"America At The Crossroads: The GUITAR And A Changing Nation" is an NGM exhibition focused on U.S. history. It uses the guitar as emblematic, and representative, of pivotal national events. Its debut is in January 2023 at the Gerald R. Ford Presidential Library and Museum in Grand Rapids, MI.

Lifetime achievement award
The NGM presents an annual "Lifetime Achievement Award" to a guitarist who has been instrumental to the legacy of the guitar. The recipients to date have been:

 2010: David Honeyboy Edwards.
 2011: Roger McGuinn of The Byrds.
 2012: B.B. King, "King of the Blues"
 2013: Vic Flick, the session guitarist who played on thousands of early British Invasion songs, known for performing the original James Bond theme song.
 2014: Buddy Guy, pioneering Chicago electric blues guitarist.
 2015: Tony Iommi, guitarist and founder of Black Sabbath, acknowledged as the creator of heavy metal.
 2016: Glen Campbell, singer-performer and notable session guitarist, his TV show helped popularize the acoustic-electric guitar.
 2017: Bonnie Raitt, blues guitarist and singer, one of the electric guitar's foremost slide players.
 2018: José Feliciano, multi-genre guitarist and internationally renowned performer.
 2019: Liona Boyd, classical guitarist.
 2020: Eddie Van Halen, In Memoriam.
 2021: Al di Meola, noted jazz, fusion, and world music guitarist.
 2022: Jeff Beck, innovative electric guitar pioneer.

See also 
 List of music museums

References

External links
 
 “GUITARS: The Sound and Science.” Community Idea Stations
 “Touring Exhibit Explores the History and Science of the Guitar.” WAMC Public Radio

2011 establishments in the United States
Museums established in 2011
Music museums in the United States
Guitars